Stathis Stathopoulos (born 8 November 1958) is a Greek professional football manager.

References

1958 births
Living people
Greek football managers
Athinaikos F.C. managers
Levadiakos F.C. managers
GAS Ialysos 1948 F.C. managers
Doxa Vyronas F.C. managers
Panargiakos F.C. managers
Ethnikos Piraeus F.C. managers
Panelefsiniakos F.C. managers
A.P.O. Akratitos Ano Liosia managers
Ethnikos Asteras F.C. managers
Panetolikos F.C. managers
Koropi F.C. managers
Kallithea F.C. managers
Apollon Smyrnis F.C. managers
Thrasyvoulos F.C. managers
Panachaiki F.C. managers
Sportspeople from Athens